Roundthwaite is a small village in Cumbria, England. It is located about a mile south west of Tebay, is part of the Tebay parish, and the majority of its land is used for farming.

Roundthwaite used to go by the name Runthwate.

Roundthwaite is mostly inhabited by the Parsley family.

References

External links

Villages in Cumbria
Tebay